The long-tailed honey buzzard (Henicopernis longicauda) is a bird of prey in the family Accipitridae.

It is found in New Guinea and some neighboring island groups. Its natural habitats are subtropical or tropical moist lowland forest and subtropical or tropical moist montane forest.

References

External links

long-tailed honey buzzard
long-tailed honey buzzard
long-tailed honey buzzard
Taxonomy articles created by Polbot